The 1975 Tour of the Basque Country was the 15th edition of the Tour of the Basque Country cycle race and was held from 14 April to 18 April 1975. The race started in Irun and finished in Hondarribia. The race was won by José Antonio González Linares of the Kas team.

General classification

References

1975
Bas